Saint-Macaire is a commune in the Gironde department in Nouvelle-Aquitaine in southwestern France.  It is the site of the Château de Tardes. Saint-Macaire station has rail connections to Agen, Langon and Bordeaux.

Population

See also
Communes of the Gironde department

References

Communes of Gironde